"This Sandwich Has No Mayonnaise" is a short story by J. D. Salinger published in Esquire in October 1945.  The story was published in the 1958 anthology The Armchair Esquire, edited by Arnold Gingrich and L. Rust Hills.

The story describes Vincent Caulfield's experience at a Georgia boot camp before embarking for the war.  He is upset because his brother Holden (as described in "Last Day of the Last Furlough") is missing in action, and is unable to accept the possibility Holden may be dead. 

In an episode of Ghost in the Shell: Stand Alone Complex, a virtual movie theater lobby, filled with other Salinger esoterica, displays a poster for a feature titled "May I have a Mayonnaise?".

References 

Short stories by J. D. Salinger
1947 short stories
Works originally published in Esquire (magazine)